Boys' Night Out (commonly abbreviated to B.N.O.) is a Filipino evening radio talk show of Magic 89.9 hosted by DJ's Slick Rick (Eric Virata), Tony Toni (Anthony James Bueno) and Sam YG (Samir Gogna) with Suzy (Tin Gamboa) on Mondays, Alex on Tuesdays and Jojo the Love Survivor on Thursdays.

History

Radio Tabloid
Boys' Night Out started as a small segment of Magic 89.9 called Radio Tabloid hosted by King DJ Logan and CJ the DJ. After moderate success the executives of the station decided to turn it into a radio talk show called Boys Night Out on March 2006 with Radio Tabloid becoming one of its segments renamed to Confession Sessions. The show was hosted by King DJ Logan with the addition of Slick Rick and Tony Toni. CJ was moved to host the weekday lunch show called the Big Meal.

King DJ Logan left the station to pursue a hosting career, a bar and resto business and worked for an Alabang call center for a time

9pm-12am era
Sam Y.G joins Magic 89.9 and replaces the outgoing King DJ Logan of boys night out.

Format and Schedule Changes
In 2010, Magic 89.9, at the turning point of its career as the #1 and most popular radio station in the Philippines, made several changes to its shows' format and time slots very much to the liking of its listeners. Boys Night Out was moved to an earlier and longer timeslot: Mondays-Thursdays, 6pm to 10pm. The show received positive feedback from its fans as it, to quote a listener: "helps ease the pain of traffic during rush hours at [sic] EDSA"

In 2015, they interviewed former Japanese AV Idol Maria Ozawa.

See also
 Boys Ride Out

References

External links

Magic 89.9
Boys Night Out on Facebook

Philippine radio programs